Semirossia tenera, also known as the lesser bobtail squid, is a widespread species of bobtail squid native to the northwest Atlantic Ocean. Its natural range covers the eastern coast of North America, from the northern Gulf of Maine to the Gulf of Mexico and the Caribbean Sea. S. tenera is possibly also present in the southwest Atlantic, specifically off the coasts of Suriname, French Guiana, Brazil, and Uruguay, although the latter records are questionable.

S. tenera grows to 50 mm in mantle length (ML).

The type specimen was collected in the northwestern Atlantic Ocean. It is deposited at the Peabody Museum of Natural History in New Haven.

References

External links 

Bobtail squid
Molluscs described in 1880